The 2013–14 season was Nottingham Forest Football Club's sixth consecutive season in the Championship since promotion in 2007–08. This page covers the period 1 July 2013 to 30 June 2014.

First Team Squad

Source: Season Statistics – Nottingham Forest F.C.

New Contracts

Player Transfers

Transfers In

Loans In

Transfers Out

Loans Out

Pre-Season Friendlies

Competitions

Championship
d

Results summary

Matches

FA Cup

League Cup

Squad statistics

Appearances and Goals

Source: Season Statistics – Nottingham Forest F.C.

Goal Scorers

Source: Player Statistics – Nottingham Forest F.C.

Disciplinary record

Source: Player Statistics – Nottingham Forest F.C.

References

Nottingham Forest F.C. seasons
Nottingham Forest